Yulieth Sanchéz-Bocanegra (born May 23, 1988 in Santander) is a judoka from Colombia.

Bio
Yulieth lives and train in Bucaramanga, Santander. She started with judo around 1999 when she was 11.

She studies physical therapy at Universidad Manuela Beltrán in Bogotá and she is in eight semester (year 2010).

Judo
She is very successful at Pan American Judo Championships, in last two years 2009 and 2010 she always got to final where she stood against Cuban Olympic medalist Yanet Bermoy. Their score is 1:1.

At 2009 World Judo Championships in Rotterdam she lost her only match with Finnish judoka Jaana Sundberg.

Achievements

References

External links
 
 Facebook page

1988 births
Living people
Colombian female judoka
Judoka at the 2011 Pan American Games
Pan American Games medalists in judo
Pan American Games bronze medalists for Colombia
South American Games bronze medalists for Colombia
South American Games medalists in judo
Competitors at the 2010 South American Games
Medalists at the 2011 Pan American Games
Sportspeople from Santander Department
20th-century Colombian women
21st-century Colombian women